Naarda ochronota is a species of moth in the family Noctuidae first described by Wileman in 1915.

References

Herminiinae
Moths described in 1915